Yan Jun (嚴畯) was an official in Eastern Wu in the Three Kingdoms period.

Yan Jun may also refer to:

 Yan Jun (general) (严俊), general of the People's Republic of China
 Yan Jun (scientist) (严俊, born 1958), Chinese scientist and politician
 Yen Chun (严俊, 1917–1990), Chinese and Hong Kong film director and actor